Colin Roxburgh McDowell  (born 1936) is a British fashion writer, designer and curator. McDowell is best known for his stint as a highly opinionated Fashion Editor for The Sunday Times, where he became a familiar sight in the front row of fashion shows, and in which capacity he claims to have been banned from more shows than any other writer.

Early life
Born in Northumberland, McDowell moved from Alnwick to Gloucester at three years old. He cultivated a strong interest in modern art and architecture as a teenager. He was educated at Durham University (Hatfield College), where he followed the arts stream of the General Studies degree and took courses in English Literature and European History, having turned down a place at Oxford because he wanted to return to the North East. As a student in Durham he wrote for the university newspaper, Palatinate, alongside future Beatles biographer Hunter Davies, and produced the 'Film Notes' column – a review of recent cinema releases. He also rowed for the Hatfield College Boat Club and was the fly half for the Durham University Rugby team that won the Collegiate European University Championship in 1955 and 1956.

After university he worked as a History teacher for a few years and later moved to teach in Italy. He eventually lost interest in this and worked as an actor, appearing in several episodes of BBC Radio 4 soap opera The Archers and TV bit-parts as a generic foreigner. His social life brought him into contact with people in the fashion industry – and he soon became intrigued by their world. By the early 1970s McDowell, after being offered a design job by a friend, settled in Rome, where he started to date fashion journalist, Anna Piaggi, and secured a job working for the couturier Pino Lancetti, who taught him everything he needed to know about the art of Haute couture. McDowell then moved on to work for the National Chamber of Italian Fashion (Camera Nazionale della Moda Italiana), then Laura Biagiotti at The House of Biagiotti, where he was responsible for brokering an exclusive deal for Biagiotti to design the uniforms for Alitalia staff.

Career in journalism
McDowell returned to London after spending 10 years in Rome. In 1984 he established his reputation as a writer with McDowell’s Directory of 20th Century Fashion, which became a standard reference work for fashion students. He made a foray into journalism by contributing an article to The Observer on Italian fashion, which led to invitations to write for other publications. In 1986 he began to focus predominantly on his emerging journalism career, being appointed a fashion reporter for The Sunday Times.

In 1989, while visiting Cairo for an assignment, he was caught up in a fire that broke out in his hotel, Sheraton Heliopolis Hotel. He escaped by jumping from a second floor window, breaking his ankle in the process. He later discovered a colleague and close friend, Jackie Moore, had died in the fire with two others. To aid his recovery from the trauma McDowell returned to Northumberland and rented a holiday cottage with a view of Lindisfarne, where he would spend the next three winters there writing, first A Woman of Style and then A Woman of Spirit. He has said that his proudest moment during his spell with The Sunday Times was when the designer Giorgio Armani threatened to pull his advertising from the paper (at £50,000 a page) because McDowell had given one of his shows a bad review.

In 2002 he got into what The Guardian described as a 'tiff' with Nicholas Coleridge. After Coleridge criticised fashion editors for being too negative about British fashion, McDowell accused him of being jingoistic. Alongside his work for The Sunday Times he continued writing books on the modern fashion industry and biographies of noteworthy designers, including close friend, John Galliano, Manolo Blahnik, and Ralph Lauren. In total, he has published more than 20 books on style.

Recent activity
In 2003 McDowell set up 'Fashion Fringe', an annual competition to uncover promising fashion design talent and offer them professional mentorship, with McDowell's stating that “We want to invest in a career, to build up a fashion business, this is no Pop Idol! We are not giving the winner £100,000 to follow trends – we want them to set them!” The scheme ended in 2013 when sponsorship became harder to secure on the back of the limited number of long term success stories to emerge from the initiative. He received an Honorary Doctorate from Heriot-Watt University in 2005. In a 2015 interview, he argued authentic criticism in contemporary fashion journalism is now increasingly hard to find, as major fashion conglomerates ensure access to shows and good seat allocation is dependent on positive coverage.

Publications
McDowell’s Directory of 20th Century Fashion (1984)
In Royal Style (1985)
Every Woman’s Guide to Looking Good (1986)
Shoes: Fashion and Fantasy (1989)
Hats: Status, Style and Glamour (1992)
Dressed to Kill: Sex, Power and Clothes (1992)
The Designer Scam (1994)
The Literary Companion to Fashion (1995)
The Man of Fashion: Peacock Males and Perfect Gentlemen (1997)
Forties Fashion and the New Look (1997)
John Galliano: Romantic, Realist and Revolutionary (1997)
Manolo Blahnik (2000)
Fashion Today (2000)
Jean Paul Gaultier (2001)
Ralph Lauren: the man, the vision, the style (2002)
DianaStyle (2007)
Matthew Williamson (2010)
The Anatomy of Fashion: Why We Dress the Way We Do (2013)

NovelsA Woman of Style (1992)A Woman of Spirit'' (1993)

See also
 List of Hatfield College alumni
 List of Durham University people

References

External links
 

1936 births
British male journalists
British fashion journalists
Alumni of Hatfield College, Durham
Living people
Members of the Order of the British Empire
The Sunday Times people
Durham University RFC players